Martin (Marty) Fleisher (born October 12, 1958) is an American bridge player, employee benefits attorney, manager of investments in life insurance policies and investment advisor.

Bridge career
Having first learned bridge at the age of eight by observing his parents and uncle, Fleisher became the youngest American Contract Bridge League (ACBL) Life Master from the New York metropolitan area in 1976 at age 17. At the same time, his team reached the final of the Grand National Teams knockout championship, making him the youngest player ever to reach the finals of a North American team bridge championship, a record he still holds. Sports Illustrated reported this accomplishment and featured Fleisher in its Faces in the Crowd section. Less than two years later he won the Intercollegiate regional bridge championship by the largest margin ever recorded in a pairs championship.

Fleisher has won eight national bridge championships and placed second in nine others. He and Eric Rodwell won the 2000 Cavendish Invitational, the world's strongest contest for money prizes.  His team won the United States Bridge Championship for open teams to gain entry into the 2011 Bermuda Bowl (as one of two US entries) where they finished 4th. His team placed second in the same event in 2013, 2017 and 2019 to qualify to play in the  Bermuda Bowls held in those years. They finished 9th in 2013 and 12th in 2019, but won the Gold Medal in August  2017 in Lyon, France.  As a result, he became a World Grandmaster, which is the highest title awarded by the World Bridge Federation.

Fleisher was named the ACBL Player of the Year for 2013, awarded annually to the member who earns the most platinum masterpoints in the calendar year.

Personal
Fleisher grew up in Teaneck, New Jersey and graduated from Teaneck High School in 1976. He attended Swarthmore College, and New York University School of Law. He lives in Manhattan with his wife, Andrea Bierstein. He is the half-brother of the American comic book writer Michael Fleisher.

Bridge accomplishments

Wins 
 World Championships (1)
 Bermuda Bowl 2017
 United States Bridge Championships (3)
Open Team Trials 2010
 Open Team Trials (second qualifier) 2013
 Open Team Trials (second qualifier) 2017
Open Team Trials (second qualifier) 2019
 North American Bridge Championships (8)
Mitchell Board-a-Match Teams (1) 2018
Spingold (1) 2016
Norman Kay Platinum Pairs (1) 2013
Vanderbilt Knockout Teams (2) 2011, 2018
 Roth Open Swiss Teams (1) 2010
 Mixed Board-a-Match Teams (1) 2005
 North American Swiss Teams (1) 2004
 Other notable wins:
 Cavendish Invitational Pairs (1) 2000
 Intercollegiate Bridge Championship (1) 1977

Runners-up
 North American Bridge Championships (9)
 Vanderbilt (2) 2003, 2010
 Jacoby Open Swiss Teams 2014
 Roth Open Swiss Teams 2013
 Grand National Teams (1) 1976
 Life Master Pairs (2) 2006, 2012
 Open Pairs I (1) 2003
 Mixed Pairs (1) 2004
 United States Bridge Championships (2)
 Open Team Trials 2009
 Open Team Trials 2016

Publications
Individual Retirement Account Answer Book, 19th edition, Aspen Publishers, 2012, .

References

External links
 . Confirmed 2011-07-11.

1958 births
Living people
American contract bridge players
Bermuda Bowl players
Swarthmore College alumni
New York University School of Law alumni
Teaneck High School alumni